Eve Boswell (born Éva Keleti; 11 May 1922 – 14 August 1998, was a Hungarian pop singer. With the outbreak of the Second World War, Eva's family moved to South Africa, where they worked with the Boswell Circus. After a few years in South Africa during which she got married, Eve was offered a temporary contract to work with a band in the United Kingdom. Eve's success with that contract eventually led to her becoming a popular solo singer in Britain in the 1950s.

Career

Éva Keleti was born in Hungary to professional musician parents who toured worldwide. Educated in Switzerland, she studied piano before joining her parents on tour as the juggling act, Three Hugos. When the Second World War was declared, the family left Britain with the Boswell Circus. She married, and as Eve Boswell became a popular singing star in South Africa.

In 1949, she was heard by bandleader Geraldo (Gerald Bright), who persuaded her to return to Britain as a singer in his band, which was widely heard on BBC Radio. Boswell was the singing voice of Vera-Ellen in the 1951 British film Happy Go Lovely. She parted with Geraldo in 1951, and launched a solo career. Her first hit record came the following year with "Sugar Bush", partly sung in Afrikaans.  Starting in March 1952, she toured for several months with comedian Derek Roy in a musical revue "Happy-Go-Lucky", before flying to Korea to entertain the armed forces. In 1953, she was with Harry Secombe in "Show of Shows" at Blackpool Opera House. She was given her own radio show on the BBC's Light programme called "Time to Dream" in October, 1953, and she appeared in the 1953 Royal Variety Performance at the London Coliseum. Boswell played alongside Tommy Cooper in "Happy and Glorious" and later with him in pantomime in 1954 in "Humpty Dumpty" at the Dudley Hippodrome.

Her major chart hit came with "Pickin' a Chicken", a South African tune with new words, which rose to No. 9 on the UK Singles Chart at the start of 1956. Her first LP, Sugar and Spice, on which she sang 10 songs in nine different languages, followed later in the year. A continuous programme of radio and TV work and tours followed, leading to more than one mental breakdown. She faded from public view as public tastes for pop music changed through the late 1950s and 1960s. Her husband died in 1970, and she opened her own singing studio in London called “Studio 9” in 1974. Some years she later she returned to South Africa, where she married the radio producer Henry Holloway, who produced her last LP, It's a Breeze, made in 1979.

Discography

Albums

1956 Sugar and Spice (Parlophone)
1957 Sentimental Eve (Parlophone, with the Reg Owen Orchestra) 
1958 The War Years (Capitol Records, with the Reg Owen Orchestra)
1959 Following the Sun Around (Parlophone)
1961 At the Mediterranean (South Africa) (Continental Records)
1962 Goeie Nuus! Good News (South Africa) (Brigadiers)
1976 Sugar Bush '76 (EMI Records)
1979 It's a Breeze (Sugarbush Records)

Singles

1949 "Confidentially" (with Geraldo and his orchestra)
1950 "Dear Hearts and Gentle People" (with Geraldo and his orchestra)
1950 "I Can Dream, Can't I?" / "Mamma Knows Best"
1950 "Bewitched" / If I Loved You
1950 "Your Heart and My Heart" / "I Remember the Cornfields"
1950 "Beloved, Be Faithful" / "Yes! I'll Be There"
1950 "All My Love"
1951 "My Heart Cries for You" / "All My Life"
1951 "Transatlantic Lullaby" /" "Broken Heart"
1951 "Would You" / "I'm in Love Again"
1951 "I'll Be Around" / "The Way That the Wind Blows"
1952 "We Won't Live in a Castle" / "Paradise"
1952 "Please, Mr. Sun" / "Love's Last Word Is Spoken"
1952 "Sugar Bush" / "I'm Yours"
1952 "Here in My Heart" / "I Ain't Gonna Marry"
1952 "Old Johnnie Goggabee" / "Your Mother and Mine"
1953 "Hi-Lili, Hi-Lo" / "Everything I Have Is Yours"
1953 "I Believe" / "Tell Me You're Mine"
1953 "If You Love Me (I Won't Care)" / Why?
1953 "A Million Stars" / "Don't Ever Leave Me"
1954 "Crystal Ball" / "Romany Violin"
1954 "Bewitched" / "Playing with Fire"
1954 "Du Bist Mein Liebchen" / "The Little Shoemaker"
1954 "Skokiaan" / "On the Waterfront"
1955 "These Are the Things We'll Share" / 
1955 "Ready, Willing, and Able" / "Pam-Poo-Dey"
1955 "The Heart You Break" / "Tika Tika Tok"
1955 "Pickin' A-Chicken" / "Blue Star (The "Medic" Theme)"
1956 "Young and Foolish" / "Where You Are"
1956 "It's Almost Tomorrow" / "Cookie"
1956 "Keeping Cool with Lemonade" / "Down By the Sugar Cane"
1956 "Saries Marais" / "Come Back My Love"
1956 "True Love" / "Where in the World Is Billy?"
1957 "Rock Bobbin' Boats" / "Tra La La"
1957 "Chantez, Chantez" / "She Said"
1957 "With All My Heart" / "Sugar Candy"
1957 "Stop Whistlin' Wolf" / "The Gypsy in My Soul"
1957 "Swedish Polka" / Tell My Love
1958 "Bobby" / "(I Love You) For Sentimental Reasons"
1958 "I Do" / "Love Me Again"
1958 "Voom - Ba - Voom" / "Left Right Out of My Heart"
1958 "More Than Ever" / "I Know Why"
1958 "The Christmas Tree" / "Christmas Lullaby"
1959 "Piccaninny" / "If I Had a Talking Picture of You"
1959 "Wimoweh Cha Cha" / "Beogoeberg Se Dam"
1959 "Once Again" / "You Are Never Far Away from Me"
1959 "Turnabout Heart" / "Misty"
1962 "Love Me" / "You're My Thrill"
1963 "Never Too Late" / "Let's Get Away"
1969 "This Is My Love" / "Lonely in a Crowd"
1974 "One God" / "Love Song"
1976 "Sugar Bush '76" / "This Time"

References

Traditional pop music singers
Musicians from Budapest
1922 births
1998 deaths
20th-century British women singers
Hungarian expatriates in Switzerland
Hungarian emigrants to South Africa
Hungarian emigrants to the United Kingdom
British emigrants to South Africa
20th-century South African women singers